Notes of a Desolate Man (Chinese: 荒人手記; pinyin: Huāng rén shǒujì) is a work of fiction written by the Taiwanese writer Chu T'ien-wen in 1994. The novella was translated into English by Howard Goldblatt and Sylvia Li-chun Lin. This queer postmodern novel is one of her most well-known works, and won the China Times Novel Prize.

Plot 

Chen-Chi Hsu summarizes the plot as follows: “The novel opens with Shao’s visit to Japan where he will spend the last five days with Ah Yao, a childhood friend who is dying of AIDS. In contrast to Ah Yao’s ostentatious embracing of his homosexual identity and his active involvement in the gay rights movement, Shao is afraid of “coming out” and is self-conscious of his own cowardice. He notes: “He was the photograph of a street demonstration. And me? I was nothing more than the negative, representing hypocrisy, as I hid in a dark closet like a coward, reversing night and day, living ignobly amid the norms of the human world” (3). In addition, the internalization of homophobia is so severe that Shao somehow replicates the main-stream biased view about homosexual promiscuity. He remarks on Ah Yao’s ceaseless pursuit of carnal pleasure with a moral tone: “[O]n the TV screen I thought I’d seen an ocean boiling red with madly copulating octopi as numerous as the sands of the Ganges. Just like Ah Yao’s lifetime of insatiable, indiscriminate mating” (2). Writing with an elegiac tone, Shao cannot help but admit that he, as a gay man, has to pay the price for exhausting vitality in pursuit of carnal pleasure in his young days”.

Characters 

 Xiao Shao (Chinese: 小韶; pinyin: Xiǎo sháo) is 40-years-old gay Taiwanese man (later identified as a mainlander) who serves as the narrator for the novel. Is best friends with Ah Yao, who is dying in Japan from complications from AIDS.
 Ah Yao (Chinese: 阿堯; pinyin: Ā yáo) is a gay/queer man and a childhood friend of Xiao Shao. He has been diagnosed with AIDS and is suffering from its complications in Japan, where he lives with his mother. Ah Yao eventually dies. 
 Ah Yao’s mother has a close relationship with Xiao Shao and treats him as if he were her own son, in contrast to her relationship with Ah Yao, who does not respect her. She is Buddhist as well. 
 Yongjie (Chinese: 永桔; pinyin: Yǒng jú) has been Xiao's partner for seven years. He is a freelance documentary filmmaker who travels to southwest China for work.
 Jay is a Taipei dancer who dates Xiao Shao at first but eventually falls out of love and instead leaves him for Jin.
 Fido dubbed as “Fido” from the Fido Dido logo on his t-shirt, is a handsome young man whom Xiao Shao met at a coffee shop.
 Beibei female friend of Xiao Shao and entrepreneur.

Style 
Notes of a Desolate Man is written in a postmodern style of "ontological dislocation," that is "notoriously" intertextual, with numerous cultural allusions, related in a stream of consciousness, and many doubts expressed about the stability of meaning. The narrator-protagonist Xiao Shao responds to his predicament by considering ideas by thinkers such as French anthropologist Claude Lévi-Strauss (especially his study Tristes Tropiques) and philosopher and gay icon Michel Foucault, as well as popular culture texts and figures as diverse as E.T.: The Extra-Terrestrial, Home Alone, Woman Basketball Player No. 5, Dream Lovers, La Dolce Vita, Tokyo Story, The Fly (two versions of the film), Aparajito, T.S. Eliot's The Waste Land, Michael Jackson, pachinko, and the Buddhist text The Diamond Sutra.

Reception 
Notes of a Desolate Man is recognized as one of Chu's most significant literary works.  

The novella was awarded the coveted China Times Novel Prize in 1994, winning grand prize of 1 million New Taiwan Dollars. 

Though written by a heterosexual woman, Notes of a Desolate Man has also been recognized as a landmark novel to thematize gay, homosexual, and queer identity, alongside such works as Pai Hsien-yung's Crystal Boys, Qiu Miaojin's Notes of a Crocodile, and Chi Ta-wei's The Membranes.

Translation 
In 1999, Columbia University Press published the English translation of the novel by Howard Goldbatt and Sylvia Li-chun Lin. Translators Goldblatt and Lin were awarded the National Translation Award from the American Literary Translators Association (ALTA) for flawlessly recapturing the original text into English. The acquiring editor likened the novel to Fyodor Dostoevsky's novella, Notes from Underground (1864).

References 

Taiwanese literature
1990s LGBT novels
Postmodern novels
Novels about HIV/AIDS